Anolis insolitus, the Cordillera central twig anole or La Palma anole, is a species of lizard in the family Dactyloidae. The species is found in the Dominican Republic.

References

Anoles
Endemic fauna of the Dominican Republic
Reptiles of the Dominican Republic
Reptiles described in 1969
Taxa named by Ernest Edward Williams